The 1964–65 DDR-Oberliga season was the 17th season of the DDR-Oberliga, the top level of ice hockey in East Germany. Eight teams participated in the league, and SG Dynamo Weißwasser won the championship.

Regular season

References

External links
East German results 1949-1970

DDR-Oberliga (ice hockey) seasons
Ober
Ger
1964 in East German sport
1965 in East German sport